The wood frog is an amphibian that has a broad distribution over North America.

Wood frog may also refer to:

 Australian wood frog, a frog found in Australia
 Long-legged wood frog, a frog found in Armenia, Azerbaijan, Georgia, Iran, Russia, Turkey, and Turkmenistan
 Siberian wood frog, a frog found in North Asia
 Small wood frog, a frog endemic to the Western Ghats of India
 Wood frog (Southeast Asia), a frog found in Cambodia, Laos, Myanmar, Thailand, and Vietnam

Animal common name disambiguation pages